Nuseir Yassin (born ) is an Arab-Israeli vlogger who is most notable for creating over 1,000 daily, one-minute-long videos on Facebook, TikTok and Instagram under the page Nas Daily.

Biography

Early life and career
Yassin was born in Arraba, Israel, to an Arab Muslim family of Palestinian descent. As a Palestinian Arab with Israeli citizenship, Yassin describes himself as a "Palestinian Israeli". He is the second of four children; his mother is a teacher and his father is a psychologist. Yassin's native language is Palestinian Arabic; he also speaks English and non-fluent Hebrew. Although he was raised as a Muslim, he has since largely stopped practicing Islam and has declared himself as a "non-religious Muslim".

Yassin applied to Harvard University in the United States at the age of 19, seeking a degree in aerospace engineering, and received a scholarship. His application essay detailed his struggle to achieve his dreams as an ethnic Arab born in Israel. He graduated with a degree in economics in 2014 and a minor in computer science. While earning his degree, Yassin co-founded a pay-it-forward registration service, and a social media search engine.

In September 2014, he started working as a software developer for Venmo, a mobile payment service owned by PayPal, in New York.

Nas Daily Facebook page
In 2016, Yassin quit his job at Venmo and decided to explore the world, with the intention of documenting his travels and experiences on video. This resulted in his creating of a Facebook page known as Nas Daily, where he would create and release a one-minute-long video daily for 1,000 days. After meeting Facebook founder Mark Zuckerberg in early 2018, Nas Daily was upgraded to "show" status, and by September 2018, his page had amassed over 8 million followers. By November of the same year, this number had risen to over 10 million.

All of Yassin's one-minute daily videos are posted to Facebook. Yassin stated in 2017 that he does not post the videos to YouTube for a multitude of reasons, including his friends not being present on the platform.

Nas Daily Official YouTube channel 
In 2019, he started to upload old videos of his on his official YouTube channel Nas Daily Official. The videos are shot using an SLR camera with an attached microphone, and are then edited before being released the next day. On average, each video takes around six hours to shoot and three hours to edit. In the beginning, the topics for Yassin's video were suggestions provided by his Facebook followers. Each video ended with the tagline: "That’s one minute, see you tomorrow!"

Yassin's collaborators include his girlfriend Alyne Tamir, an American Israeli video-maker of Mormon and Jewish background, and Agon Hare, a video blogger and musician from Poland. 

Due to the popularity of the videos with non-English speaking audiences, subtitles are provided in various languages, such as Urdu, Turkish, Thai, Indonesian, Japanese, Hindi, Chinese and Arabic.

After Nas Daily
Yassin finished the 1000 daily video journey on 5 January 2019, ending the last video with the tagline: "That's one minute, see you soon." On 1 February 2019, he started making one video per week, for a planned 100 weeks until the beginning of 2021. 

He previously lived in Singapore, but currently resides in Dubai, United Arab Emirates. His memoir, Around the World in 60 Seconds: The Nas Daily Journey, was released on 5 November 2019.

In 2020, Yassin created Nas Academy, a school for video creators and Nas Studios, a video-production studio. He also released a series of podcasts. 

In 2021, Nas Academy removed an educational course by Filipino Kalinga tattoo artist Whang-Od from its platform, after the artist's grandniece said Whang-Od had never made any agreement with Nas Academy. In response, Yassin posted a video in social media which showed Whang-od affixing her thumbprint to a document as proof of the tattoo artist's consent. The National Commission on Indigenous Peoples (NCIP) noted that posting a contract in social media does not equate to proof of compliance. The NCIP has since launched a review, on-site validation, and interview to determine the validity of the contract and whether there was informed consent. The issue was resolved on October 24, 2021 after representatives from Nas Academy Philippines have formally apologized to Whang-Od and the elders and members of the community in a customary process and meeting set up by the NCIP. The community's request to declare the contract as declared null and void was affirmed by the legal team of Nas Academy.

References

External links
 Nas Daily - Official website

Palestinian artists
Arab citizens of Israel
Video bloggers
Living people
People from Arraba, Israel
1992 births
Harvard University alumni
Palestinian bloggers
Israeli bloggers
Israeli YouTubers
Israeli expatriates in Singapore
Israeli expatriates in the United Arab Emirates
Palestinian Muslims
Palestinian YouTubers
People with acquired Saint Kitts and Nevis citizenship